Duets was a special 1984 album released by Liberty Records from Kenny Rogers. It was issued after Rogers left the label and signed to RCA Nashville.

Overview
Duets opens with "We've Got Tonight", a hit 1983 single with Sheena Easton. Side two begins with another classic duet, "Don't Fall in Love with a Dreamer" with Kim Carnes from the 1980 album Gideon. All of the remaining eight songs on the album are with Dottie West and come from his two collaboration albums with West, including the 1978 hit "Every Time Two Fools Collide" from the 1978 album of the same name. However, their duet "What Are We Doin' in Love" (a No. 1 country and top 40 pop hit) from 1981 is missing.

Also included on this album is Sonny and Cher's "All I Ever Need Is You". Rogers' producer Larry Butler co-wrote "(Hey Won't You Play) Another Somebody Done Somebody Wrong Song" with Chips Moman. "'Til I Can Make It On My Own" and "That's the Way It Could Have Been" are two Tammy Wynette numbers.

While this is a compilation album, there was still a single released from it. "Together Again", one of the many duets with West and which first appeared on Classics, reached No. 19 on the US country chart and No. 29 in Canada.

The album was eventually certified platinum and gold in the US and Canada, respectively. It reached No. 43 on the US country charts and No. 85 on the pop charts in 1984. It was one of three Kenny Rogers albums to chart that year, the others being new releases on RCA.

Track listing
All tracks with Dottie West, unless otherwise indicated.

Chart performance

Certifications

References

External links 
[ Duets at Allmusic]

1984 compilation albums
Kenny Rogers compilation albums
Vocal duet albums
Albums produced by Larry Butler (producer)